Black Mixen is a subsidiary summit of Rhos Fawr or Great Rhos in the Radnor Forest. The summit is large peat bog plateau. The summit is marked with a cairn, and is next to a radio transmitter and its building.

Black Mixen is the only Nuttall to have a communications mast (a radio transmitter) on its summit. To the east is Bache Hill, to the south are the Black Mountains, to the west is the Great Rhos plateau.

The summit cairn is probably of Bronze Age date, with most peaks in the area showing similar barrowss.

References

External links
www.geograph.co.uk : photos of Great Rhos and surrounding area

Radnor Forest
Mountains and hills of Powys
Hewitts of Wales
Nuttalls